Kamel al-Wazir is the Transport Minister of Egypt. He succeeded minister Hisham Arafat who resigned after the Ramses Station rail disaster. Kamel al-Wazir had been heading the Engineering Authority of the Armed Forces before being appointed as the minister. During his tenure as well, an accident happened as two trains collided in Upper Egypt for which, he issued an official apology.

Early life and career 
Wazir studied Civil and Architectural Engineering at the Military Technical College and also holds a Masters in Military Sciences.  He was involved in key projects of Egypt like digging of the new Suez Canal, developing the Al Galala Plateau in Ain Sukhna.

Awards 

 Medal of Long Service and Good Example
 Medal of Military Duty, first degree

References 

Living people
Year of birth missing (living people)
Transport ministers of Egypt